Ceuthophilus alpinus is a species of camel crickets in the family Rhaphidophoridae. It is found in North America.

References

 Capinera J.L, Scott R.D., Walker T.J. (2004). Field Guide to Grasshoppers, Katydids, and Crickets of the United States. Cornell University Press.
 Otte, Daniel (2000). "Gryllacrididae, Stenopelmatidae, Cooloolidae, Schizodactylidae, Anostostomatidae, and Rhaphidophoridae". Orthoptera Species File 8, 97.

Further reading

 Arnett, Ross H. (2000). American Insects: A Handbook of the Insects of America North of Mexico. CRC Press.

alpinus
Insects described in 1894